Frederick A. Young  (9 October 1902 – 1 December 1998) was a British cinematographer. He is probably best known for his work on David Lean's films Lawrence of Arabia (1962), Doctor Zhivago (1965) and Ryan's Daughter (1970), all three of which won him Academy Awards for Best Cinematography. He was often credited as F. A. Young.

He was also director of photography on more than 130 films, including many other notable productions, such as Goodbye, Mr Chips (1939), 49th Parallel (1941), Lust for Life (1956), The Inn of the Sixth Happiness (1958), Lord Jim (1965), Battle of Britain (1969), Nicholas and Alexandra (1971), and the James Bond film You Only Live Twice (1967). He was also the first British cinematographer to film in CinemaScope. Young co-wrote The Work of the Motion Picture Cameraman with Paul Petzold, published in 1972 (Focal Press, London).

Young served as a captain and chief cameraman of the British Army's Kinematograph Unit during World War II.

In 2003, a survey conducted by the International Cinematographers Guild placed Young among the ten most influential cinematographers in history.

He was awarded the Royal Photographic Society's Centenary Medal and Honorary Fellowship (HonFRPS) in recognition of a sustained, significant contribution to the art of photography in 1996/97.

In 1984, at the age of 82, Young directed his only film, Arthur's Hallowed Ground, starring Jimmy Jewel, which was made for television.

Selected films

Victory (1928)
 White Cargo (1929)
 A Peep Behind the Scenes (1929)
Canaries Sometimes Sing (1930)
Rookery Nook (1930)
The W Plan (1930)
 Tons of Money (1930)
 On Approval (1930)
 A Warm Corner (1930)
White Cargo (1930)
 Mischief (1931)
Carnival (1931)
 Plunder (1931)
The Chance of a Night Time (1931)
 The Sport of Kings (1931)
 Tilly of Bloomsbury (1931)
The Speckled Band (1931)
The Blue Danube (1932)
 The Mayor's Nest (1932)
 Leap Year (1932)
 A Night Like This (1932)
Good Night, Vienna (1932)
 It's a King (1933)
 Night of the Garter (1933)
 Trouble (1933)
 Up for the Derby (1933)
Bitter Sweet (1933)
A Cuckoo in the Nest (1933)
 Girls, Please! (1934)
 The Queen's Affair (1934)
Nell Gwynn (1934)
Peg of Old Drury (1935)
Escape Me Never (1935)
When Knights Were Bold (1936)
The Frog (1936)
 Fame (1936)
 Three Maxims (1936)
Limelight (1936)
Two's Company (1936)
Victoria the Great (1937)
 Sunset in Vienna (1937)
 London Melody (1937)
Millions (1937)
Sixty Glorious Years (1938)
Nurse Edith Cavell (1939)
Goodbye, Mr. Chips (1939)
Busman's Honeymoon (1940)
Contraband (1940)
49th Parallel (1941)
The Young Mr. Pitt (1942)
Caesar and Cleopatra (1945)
Bedelia (1946)
So Well Remembered (1947)
While I Live (1947)
The Winslow Boy (1948)
Treasure Island (1950)
 Calling Bulldog Drummond (1951)
Ivanhoe (1952)
Mogambo (1953)
Knights of the Round Table (1953)
Lust for Life (1956)
Invitation to the Dance (1956)
Bhowani Junction (1956)
Island in the Sun (1957)
The Barretts of Wimpole Street (1957)
The Inn of the Sixth Happiness (1958)
Gideon's Day (1958)
Indiscreet (1958)
I Accuse! (1958)
Solomon and Sheba (1959)
The Greengage Summer (1961)
Lawrence of Arabia (1962)
Lord Jim (1965)
Rotten to the Core (1965)
Doctor Zhivago (1965)
The Deadly Affair (1967)
You Only Live Twice (1967)
Battle of Britain (1969)
Ryan's Daughter (1970)
Nicholas and Alexandra (1971)
The Asphyx (1973)
Luther (1973)
The Blue Bird (1976)
Stevie (1978)
Rough Cut (1980)
Sword of the Valiant (1984)

References

External links
. Biography and filmography

The Making of Lawrence of Arabia, Digitised BAFTA Journal, Winter 1962–3, including article by Freddie Young

1902 births
1998 deaths
British Army personnel of World War II
British Army officers
Military personnel from London
Film people from London
BAFTA fellows
Best Cinematographer Academy Award winners
British cinematographers
Officers of the Order of the British Empire